Lucy Robinson (born 21 May 1999) is a British wheelchair basketball player (4.5 wheelchair basketball classification) from Leicester. She is a member of the Great Britain women's national wheelchair basketball team and Sheffield Hallam Wheelchair Basketball club. She comes from Mountsorrel and is a primary school teacher.

Robinson became disabled after breaking her hip in a roller skating accident. This led to avascular necrosis, a condition causing cellular death in the bone due to interrupted blood supply. After her injury she was unable to continue with playing football. As a teenager, she started playing wheelchair basketball at the Leicester Cobras club in Leicester after a wheelchair basketball trial event at the club. At the 2018 International Wheelchair Basketball Federation U24 European championship, she helped secure a gold medal for Great Britain, helping earn a bronze medal at the U25 World championship in 2019. She was named 2020 Sportswoman of the Year at the Team Hallam Sports Ball and her team Sheffield Hallam Wheelchair Basketball club was named 2020 Team of the Year. In 2021 she made her debut appearance as a senior in the delayed 2020 Summer Paralympics in Tokyo.

She studied at the Sheffield Hallam University.

References

External links
 

1999 births
Living people
British women's wheelchair basketball players
Place of birth missing (living people)
Paralympic wheelchair basketball players of Great Britain
Wheelchair basketball players at the 2020 Summer Paralympics